Anton "Toni" Usnik (born 17 September 1973) is a Slovenian football coach and former player.

He currently serves as assistant coach of the Iranian national team under Dragan Skočić, having previously worked with him at Interblock, Al-Arabi, Al-Nassr and Khooneh Be Khooneh. Between 2011 and 2012, served as the first assistant coach of the Slovenian national team under Slaviša Stojanovič.

During his playing career, Usnik played professional in Slovenia, Germany and Iceland.

Playing career 

Usnik, who was an offensive midfielder, played club football in Slovenia for NK Svoboda Ljubljana, NK Ljubljana, NK Celje, NK Slavija Vevče, NK Domžale, NK Korotan Prevalje, NK Šmartno ob Paki, NK Bela Krajina, and NK Interblock. In Germany, he played for 1. FC Kaiserslautern B team, and in Iceland for Leiftur-Dalvik.

References

External links
PrvaLiga profile 

1973 births
Living people
Footballers from Ljubljana
Yugoslav footballers
Slovenian footballers
Slovenian expatriate footballers
Slovenia under-21 international footballers
Association football midfielders
NK Svoboda Ljubljana players
NK Ljubljana players
NK Celje players
NK Domžale players
C.F. União players
NK IB 1975 Ljubljana players
Slovenian PrvaLiga players
Slovenian Second League players
Slovenian expatriate sportspeople in Germany
Expatriate footballers in Germany
Expatriate footballers in Iceland
Slovenian expatriate sportspeople in Iceland
Knattspyrnufélag Fjallabyggðar players